Telegraphic Transfer or telex transfer, often abbreviated to TT, is a term used to refer to an electronic means of transferring funds. A transfer charge is often charged by the sending bank and in some cases by the receiving bank.

Historically telegraphic transfer meant a cable message from one bank to another in order to effect the transfer of money. Prior to the existence of electronic payment networks this was often directly between banks via a telex message.

Current use

Hong Kong 
In Hong Kong, the term "telegraphic transfer" is synonymous to international SWIFT transfer.

Japan 
In Japan, "telegraphic transfer" is the industry term for quoting retail exchange rates (larger quantities are quoted individually), and is divided into three rates, stated in yen, from the point of view of the quoting bank:

 TTM: Telegraphic Transfer Middle rate (mid price)
 TTS: Telegraphic Transfer Selling rate (ask price)
 TTB: Telegraphic Transfer Buying rate (bid price)
The middle rate is the average of the buying and selling rate, and these trade at a fixed bid–offer spread (in yen). For example, the USD is quoted with a spread of 2 JPY, so if the mid-market rate is 100 JPY = US$1, the rates are as follows:
 TTS: 101 JPY: bank will charge more than mid price to sell USD
 TTM: 100 JPY: average, bank does not trade at this price
 TTB: 99 JPY: bank will pay less than mid price to buy USD
These rates are published daily by major Japanese banks, and used for accounting and tax calculations, in addition to retail use.

Singapore 
The term "Telegraphic Transfer" is a frequently used term in Singapore to describe cross-border fund transfers. Other less commonly used terms in Singapore are wire transfer and bank transfer.
 TT: This is the abbreviation sometimes used to imply Telegraphic Transfer

United Kingdom
The term is now most often used in UK banking and in law to refer to either a CHAPS transfer for domestic transfers or a SWIFT transfer for international transfers.

The term is also used to describe other electronic funds transfer methods and, incorrectly, low cost everyday payment methods such as BACS (Bankers' Automated Clearing Services) payments, Faster Payments Service and SEPA credit transfers. Although the United Kingdom is part of SEPA with the consequent low costs of intra-SEPA payments, most UK banks charge for SEPA credit transfers as if they were telegraphic transfers, unlike banks in other non-Eurozone SEPA countries such as Switzerland and Sweden where SEPA credit transfers are charged at similar low fees to domestic payments.

See also

 Wire transfer
 SWIFT

References

Electronic funds transfer